The Snoqualmie Valley is a farming and timber-producing region located along the Snoqualmie River in Western Washington, United States.  The valley stretches from the confluence of the three forks of the river at North Bend to the confluence of the Snoqualmie River and the Skykomish River (home to the Skykomish / Skai-whamish, a Snoqualmie band), forming the Snohomish River at Monroe.  This stretch of the river includes Snoqualmie Falls. Towns in the valley are North Bend, Snoqualmie, Preston, Fall City, Carnation, and Duvall.

Hops were the major crop of this region in the late 19th century.

The valley is the ancestral home of the Snoqualmie people.  The name Snoqualmie comes from the native word for "Moon the Transformer" and originates in the creation myth of the Snoqualmie people.

Culture 
Although the Snoqualmie Valley consists of several cities, the main ones are Snoqualmie, North Bend, Carnation, and Duvall.

Transportation 

The eastern side of the Snoqualmie Valley is served by State Route 203, which runs from Fall City to Monroe.

External links 
Snoqualmie legend of Moon the Transformer at HistoryLink

Landforms of King County, Washington
Valleys of Washington (state)